Delores Goodwin Kelley (born May 1, 1936) is an American politician from Maryland and a member of the Democratic Party. She was a member of the Maryland Senate, representing Maryland's District 10 in Baltimore County.

Background
Born in Norfolk, Virginia on May 1, 1936, Kelley received a bachelor's degree from Virginia State College in 1956. She went on to earn three more degrees; an M.A. in education from New York University, an M.A. in speech communication from Purdue University, and a Ph.D. in American studies from the University of Maryland, College Park. A lifelong educator, Kelley has taught at Coppin State University since 1973. She volunteered or served with a number of organizations, most prominently the Democratic Party, the National Endowment for the Humanities, and the Baltimore Urban League. Kelley is a member of the Union Baptist Church in Baltimore.

In the legislature
Kelley was originally elected to the legislature as a member of the House of Delegates in 1991. Following redistricting and after only one term in the House, she successfully ran for a seat in the State Senate representing Baltimore County. Kelley serves both as the chair of the Executive Nominations Committee and as a member of the Finance Committee.  She is also a member of the Maryland State Commission on Criminal Sentencing Policy and the Legislative Black Caucus of Maryland. Along with Sen. Paul G. Pinsky, she is the longest serving member of the Maryland Senate.

In December 2021, Kelley announced that she would not seek re-election.

References

External links

Living people
1936 births
Democratic Party Maryland state senators
Virginia State University alumni
Democratic Party members of the Maryland House of Delegates
Purdue University College of Health and Human Sciences alumni
University of Maryland, College Park alumni
Steinhardt School of Culture, Education, and Human Development alumni
Women state legislators in Maryland
African-American women in politics
Politicians from Norfolk, Virginia
2008 United States presidential electors
African-American state legislators in Maryland
21st-century American politicians
21st-century American women politicians
2004 United States presidential electors
21st-century African-American women
21st-century African-American politicians
20th-century African-American people
20th-century African-American women